The Police Dog Unit, (Abbreviation: PDU) established in 1949, is a specialist force of the Hong Kong Police under the direct command of the Special Operations Bureau. Its role is in crowd control, search and rescue and poison and explosive detection. In addition, the Police Dog Unit works in collaboration with other departments for anti-crime operations.

See also
 Police dog

References

External links
Police Dog Unit

1949 establishments in Hong Kong
Hong Kong Police Force
Police dogs
Organizations established in 1949
People working with dogs